Leutrim Osaj (born 29 March 1992 in Slovenia) is an Albanian footballer. And ex Professional player, who plays currently  as a midfielder for VTG Queichhambach in Germany.

References

External links
 Footballdatabase profile

1992 births
Living people
Sportspeople from Maribor
Slovenian people of Albanian descent
Slovenian footballers
Albanian footballers
Association football midfielders
NK Maribor players
NK Nafta Lendava players
Albanian expatriate footballers
Expatriate footballers in Slovenia
Albanian expatriate sportspeople in Slovenia
Expatriate footballers in Germany
Albanian expatriate sportspeople in Germany